Arbanitis robertcollinsi is a species of armoured trap-door spider in the family Idiopidae, and is endemic to Queensland, where it has been found only in Lamington National Park. 

It was first described by Robert Raven & Graham Wishart in 2006.

References

Idiopidae
Spiders described in 2006
Spiders of Australia
Fauna of Queensland
Taxa named by Robert Raven